Košarkaški klub Borac, commonly referred to as Borac Banja Luka, is a men's professional basketball club based in Banja Luka, Republika Srpska, Bosnia and Herzegovina. They are currently competing in the Championship of Bosnia and Herzegovina and the ABA League Second Division.

Borac also has a reserve team, called Borac Mako Print, that plays in the 3rd-tier Second League of Republika Srpska – Western Division.

This club is not a part of the Borac Banja Luka Sports Society, like SKK Borac 1947.

History
In 2006, the club changed its name to Borac Nektar after SKK Banjalučka pivara got relegated from Bosnian Championship and folded.

In 2020, Borac got promoted to the Championship of Bosnia and Herzegovina for the 2020–21 season. The club returned to the 1st-tier national league for the first time since the 2012–13 season. On 15 September 2020, the club signed a contract on sports and technical cooperation with the Adriatic League club Igokea. On 13 October 2020, the club received a wild card for the 2020–21 ABA League 2 season.

Home arena
Borac plays its home games at the Borik Sports Hall. The hall is located in the Borik Neighbourhood, Banja Luka, and was built in 1974. It has a seating capacity of 3,060 seats.

Players

Current roster

Head coaches

 Drago Karalić (2006–2007)
 Tomica Zirojević  (2007, interim)
 Slobodan Nikolić (2007–2008)
 Miloš Pejić (2008–2009)
 Bojan Božić (2009)
 Borislav Džaković (2009–2010)
 Drago Karalić (2010–2015)
 Bojan Božić (2015–2018)
 Marko Taušan (2018)
 Dragan Mičić (2018–2019)
 Marko Šćekić (2019–2020)
 Dragan Nikolić (2020–2022)
 Zoran Kašćelan (2022–present)

Season-by-season

Trophies and awards

Trophies 

Trophies in Italic text indicates those which are under ongoing dispute with SKK Borac 1947.

Notable players 
 Draško Albijanić
 Siniša Kovačević
 Robert Rothbart
 Nemanja Vranješ
 Ognjen Kuzmić

References

External links

 at Eurobasket.com

Basketball teams in Bosnia and Herzegovina
Basketball teams established in 2006
Sport in Banja Luka